Prattville is a city located within both Autauga and Elmore counties in the State of Alabama but serves as the county seat of Autauga County. As of the 2020 census, the population of the city was 37,781. Nicknamed "The Fountain City" due to the many artesian wells in the area, Prattville is part of the Montgomery metropolitan statistical area.

History
Prattville was founded in 1839 by industrialist and architect Daniel Pratt. The area was largely inhabited by Native Americans and a few settlers when Pratt, a native of Temple, New Hampshire, first observed the Autauga Creek in the 1830s. The location was chosen because the creek could supply power to the cotton gin manufacturing equipment. The town became an industrial center and rapidly grew. In 1868, it was named the county seat for Autauga County.

Prattville contains several sites on the National Register of Historic Places, including the Daniel Pratt Historic District, Bell House and Buena Vista.

Geography
Prattville is located at  (32.462235, -86.461264). The city is located northwest of Montgomery and along Interstate 65 and U.S. Route 82. I-65 runs north to south east of downtown, with access from exits 179 and 181, both in the Elmore County portion of the city. I-65 leads southeast  to downtown Montgomery and north  to Birmingham. US 82 runs south with I-65 to downtown Montgomery, and northwest  to Tuscaloosa.

Demographics

2020 census

As of the 2020 United States census, there were 37,781 people, 14,069 households, and 9,658 families residing in the city.

2010 census
As of the census of 2010, there were 33,960 people, 12,711 households, and 9,305 families residing in Prattville. The racial makeup of the city was 78.5% White, 16.7% Black or African American, 0.4% Native American, 1.4% Asian, 0.1% Pacific Islander, 1.1% from other races, and 1.8% from two or more races. 3.1% of the population were Hispanic or Latino of any race.

There were 12,711 households, out of which 35.5% had children under the age of 18 living with them, 55.1% were married couples living together, 4.1% had a male householder with no wife present, 14.0% had a female householder with no husband present, and 26.8% were non-families. 22.9% of all households were made up of individuals, and 7.9% had someone living alone who was 65 years of age or older. The average household size was 2.64 and the average family size was 3.12.

In the city, the age distribution of the population showed 27.1% under the age of 18, 8.5% from 18 to 24, 27.9% from 25 to 44, 24.6% from 45 to 64, and 11.9% who were 65 years of age or older. The median age was 36.3 years. For every 100 females, there were 91.1 males. For every 100 females age 18 and over, there were 87.6 males.

In 2000, the median income for a household in the city was $45,728, and the median income for a family was $51,774. Males had a median income of $36,677 versus $22,978 for females. The per capita income for the city was $19,832. 8.3% of the population and 6.4% of families were below the poverty line. Out of the total population, 9.3% of those under the age of 18 and 9.2% of those 65 and older were living below the poverty line.

Climate
According to the Köppen climate classification, Prattville has a humid subtropical climate (abbreviated Cfa).

Severe weather
On February 17, 2008, Prattville was hit by an EF3 tornado which destroyed more than 45 homes and businesses and damaged over 700. Twenty-nine people were injured with no fatalities. Preliminary estimates put the damage at $85 million in insured and uninsured damages.

Education
Most of Prattville (the Autauga County portion) is part of the Autauga County School System, and has eight schools, including Prattville High School and the Autauga County Technology Center. The Elmore County portion is in the Elmore County Public School System.

Prattville Christian Academy and Autauga Academy are private schools based in the city. East Memorial Christian Academy was located in an unincorporated area of Autauga County, near Prattville, until it was closed down.

Media
Prattville is part of the Montgomery television market. WOW! (formerly Knology) and Charter provide cable television service. DirecTV and Dish Network provide direct broadcast satellite television including both local and national channels to area residents. Prattville is also served by the twice-weekly Prattville Progress newspaper.

Recreation
The city has become a popular golf destination, featuring the Capitol Hill golf courses (part of the Robert Trent Jones Golf Trail). Its Senator Course hosted the Navistar (now Yokohama Tire) LPGA Classic on the LPGA Tour from 2007 through 2012 when Navistar ended its sponsorship. There was no LPGA event at this course in 2013. The 2014 event, now known as the Yokohama Tire LPGA Classic after its new sponsor, was scheduled for September 18–21.

High Point Town Center is a large shopping center built in Prattville between 2007 and 2008. 10,000-capacity Stanley-Jensen Stadium is located in Prattville. It is mainly used for football and soccer.

Transportation
Major highways that pass through the city include:

Prattville also has a small airport about 3.5 miles from downtown.

Historical markers

Happy Hollow
Known for the signature hill that turns into a steep curve, located on present-day 6th Street, Happy Hollow was the center of African American life in Prattville in the 1950s. This marker was erected to honor the spirit of "equality" that resonated in Happy Hollow.

Notable people
 Marlon Anderson, Major League Baseball player
 Kaitlan Collins, journalist
 Evan Crawford, Major League Baseball player
 Bobby Greenwood, NFL offensive tackle
 Roman Harper, NFL player.
 O. J. Howard, former Tight End for the Alabama Crimson Tide. He was drafted 1st Round 19th Overall to the Tampa Bay Buccaneers
 C. M. Hazen, head coach for the University of Richmond football team from 1882 to 1888
 Randy Hunt, former Major League Baseball catcher
 Wilson Pickett, R&B and soul singer and songwriter "Rock and Roll Hall of Fame"
 Charlie Lucas, sculptor
 Tommy Shaw, member of the band Styx
 Brandon Taylor, author
 Daniel Holcombe Thomas, chief judge of the United States District Court for the Southern District of Alabama from 1966 to 1971
 Trust Company, alternative rock/post-grunge band
 Kevin Turner, NFL player
 Ernie Wingard, pitcher for the St. Louis Browns from 1924 to 1927
 Zac Woodfin, NFL player.
 Steve Gainer, Cinematographer
 Nick Perry, NFL player and coach

Popular culture
Gabriel García Marquez mentions Prattville in his well-known work One Hundred Years of Solitude; Prattville is referred to as the original city of Jack Brown, the founder of the banana company.

Folklore 
A popular ghost-story known as "The Black Lady," inspired by deaths caused by poor working conditions in the nearby factories of downtown Prattville, is a popular phenomenon described by most as a black, ghastly figure that goes across the nearby dam during the night hours of 1 am to 4 am and has been featured on the ghost hunting show, Deep South Paranormal.

This story, and additional Prattville ghost stories are cited by Digital Alabama.

Gallery

References

External links

 

 
Cities in Alabama
Cities in Autauga County, Alabama
Cities in Elmore County, Alabama
Populated places established in 1839
County seats in Alabama
Montgomery metropolitan area
1839 establishments in the United States